Laidlaw is a defunct bus transportation contractor.

Laidlaw may also refer to:
Laidlaw (novel), a novel by William McIlvanney
Laidlaw, British Columbia
Laidlaw College, New Zealand
Laidlaw (surname)
Laidlaw, an educational publisher later acquired by McGraw-Hill